In mathematics, a graph polynomial is a graph invariant whose values are polynomials. Invariants of this type are studied in algebraic graph theory.
Important graph polynomials include:
The characteristic polynomial, based on the graph's adjacency matrix.
The chromatic polynomial, a polynomial whose values at integer arguments give the number of colorings of the graph with that many colors.
The dichromatic polynomial, a 2-variable generalization of the chromatic polynomial
The flow polynomial, a polynomial whose values at integer arguments give the number of nowhere-zero flows with integer flow amounts modulo the argument.
The (inverse of the) Ihara zeta function, defined as a product of binomial terms corresponding to certain closed walks in a graph.
The Martin polynomial, used by Pierre Martin to study Euler tours
The matching polynomials, several different polynomials defined as the generating function of the matchings of a graph.
The reliability polynomial, a polynomial that describes the probability of remaining connected after independent edge failures
The Tutte polynomial, a polynomial in two variables that can be defined (after a small change of variables) as the generating function of the numbers of connected components of induced subgraphs of the given graph, parameterized by the number of vertices in the subgraph.

See also
Knot polynomial

References

Polynomials
Graph invariants